
Gmina Mała Wieś is a rural gmina (administrative district) in Płock County, Masovian Voivodeship, in east-central Poland. Its seat is the village of Mała Wieś, which lies approximately 28 kilometres (17 mi) south-east of Płock and 67 km (41 mi) north-west of Warsaw.

Villages
Gmina Mała Wieś contains the villages and settlements of Borzeń, Brody Duże, Brody Małe, Dzierżanowo, Dzierżanowo-Osada, Główczyn, Kiełtyki, Kupise, Lasocin, Liwin, Mała Wieś, Murkowo, Nakwasin, Niździn, Nowe Arciszewo, Nowe Gałki, Nowe Święcice, Nowy Chylin, Orszymowo, Perki, Podgórze, Podgórze-Parcele, Przykory, Rąkcice, Ściborowo, Stare Arciszewo, Stare Gałki, Stare Święcice, Węgrzynowo, Wilkanowo and Zakrzewo Kościelne.

Neighbouring gminas
Gmina Mała Wieś is bordered by the gminas of Bodzanów, Bulkowo, Iłów, Naruszewo, Słubice and Wyszogród.

References
Polish official population figures 2006

Mala Wies
Płock County